Haytham ibn Khalid was the first Shirvanshah, or independent ruler of Shirvan, renouncing the suzerainty of the Abbasid Caliphate in 861 and beginning the Mazyadid dynasty.

Biography 
He was the son of the Shaybani Arab Khalid ibn Yazid al-Shaybani and the grandson of Yazid ibn Mazyad al-Shaybani, both of whom had repeatedly served the Abbasid Caliphate as governors of Arminiya, a vast province encompassing most of the Transcaucasus, with Armenia, Iberia (Georgia) Albania (Azerbaijan). His brother Muhammad ibn Khalid al-Shaybani also served as governor of Arminiya. This succession of Shaybanid governors enabled them to become firmly entrenched in the region, especially in Shirvan, which came to be ruled directly by Haytham. Haytham soon adopted the Persian title "Shirvanshah", and after the murder of the Abbasid caliph al-Mutawakkil in 861, Haytham and his heirs became de facto  independent rulers of Shirvan. His brother Yazid ibn Khalid declared himself independent as the "Layzanshah", thus starting the Persianization of the family of Haytham. Nothing more is known about Haytham, except that he was at an unknown date succeeded by his son Muhammad I.

References

Sources 
 
 

9th-century rulers in Asia
9th-century Arabs
Iranian people of Arab descent